Böllen is a municipality in the southwestern German Federal State of Baden-Württemberg, part of the Lörrach district. The coat of arms of Böllen were granted in 1902. The blazon is Azure issuant from a Base Vert a Mountain Or, reflecting the town's proximity to Mount Belchen, the second highest mountain in the Black Forest.

References 

Lörrach (district)
Baden